The following is a list of Ethiopian–Somali wars and conflicts, giving an overview of the historic and recent conflicts between Ethiopia and Somalia.

 1964 Ethiopian–Somali Border War
 1977–1978 Ogaden War
 1982 Ethiopian–Somali Border War
 1998–2000 Cross-border warfare during the chaotic warlord-led era.
2006–2009 Ethiopian war in Somalia

See also
 Ethiopian–Somali conflict
 Military history of Somalia
 Military history of Ethiopia
 Foreign relations of Somalia
 Foreign relations of Ethiopia
 List of wars involving Ethiopia

References

Somali wars
Ethiopian wars
Somalia
Ethiopia
Wars